Nina Li Chi (born December 31, 1961) is a retired Hong Kong actress. She is married to actor Jet Li.

Early life 
Li was born on December 31, 1961, in Shanghai, China. Her father was a stage actor.

Career 
In 1986, Li was the winner of Miss Asia Pacific Hong Kong. On September 30, 1986, Li was a beauty pageant participant of Miss Asia Pacific Quest 1986, and she placed as third runner up.

In 1986, Li's film career began in Hong Kong with the film The Seventh Curse.

Personal life
On September 19, 1999, Lì married Jet Li, her co-star from the 1989 film, Dragon Fight. They have two daughters together, Jane Li (b. 2000) and Jada Li (b. 2002).

Filmography

Films

See also 
 Miss Asia Pageant#Miss Asia Pacific

References

External links

 Nina Lì Ch at hkcinemagic.com

1961 births
Living people
Hong Kong film actresses
Actresses from Shanghai